Jonathan Taumateine (born 28 September 1996) is a Samoan rugby union player who has played for the  and the  in the Super Rugby competition. He has signed with the Moana Pasifika for the 2022 Super Rugby Pacific season. His position of choice is scrum-half.

In July 2021, he was named in the Samoa squad for the July internationals. Taumateine made his international debut for Samoa on the 10th July in a 42–13 win over Tonga.

References

External links

New Zealand rugby union players
Samoan rugby union players
Samoa international rugby union players
1996 births
Living people
Rugby union scrum-halves
Counties Manukau rugby union players
Chiefs (rugby union) players
Hurricanes (rugby union) players
Moana Pasifika players